Polara is the self-titled first album by Minneapolis alternative rock band Polara.

The group was founded and led by musician and producer Ed Ackerson. The band was considered one of the most prominent and creative groups to emerge from Minneapolis in the 1990s. Billboard writer Deborah Russell called Ackerson and Polara the front of "the emergence of a new local (Twin Cities) scene" more interested in pop music and postpunk than the punk rock of bands like Hüsker Dü and The Replacements, and Matt Hendrickson of Rolling Stone called him "the kingpin of a resurgent Minneapolis music scene."
After the breakup of his previous band, The 27 Various, and a short stint as second guitarist in Blake Babies singer John Strohm's band Antenna, Ackerson formed Polara in 1994 with guitarist Jennifer Jurgens, bassist Jason Orris, and Trip Shakespeare's Matt Wilson on drums. The new group continued his interest in 1960s mod-rock and Syd Barrett-style psychedelia and added a heavy element of Krautrock-inspired electronics and keyboards. Released on the Twin Cities label Clean (Twin/Tone), Polara built on the 27 Various' increasing critical buzz, gaining significant national attention. Besides the main band members, Strohm also contributed on multiple instruments.

Reception
The album was well-received by critics. Los Angeles Times pop-music critic Robert Hilburn called it a "wonderfully appealing indie debut" with "solid songwriting craft … sweet melodies and soulful introspection." Allmusic writer Rick Anderson called "weird but lovable" and "as fresh and bracing as a bucket of ice water in the face," and said that the band's ability to shift between musical styles made it hard to pigeonhole. Billboard writer Chris Morris called it "the first truly great album (I have) heard in 1995." Another Billboard review called the song "Counting Down" "one of the best modern rock singles of the year." Paul Evans of Rolling Stone praised Ackerson's production, saying "he that delivers sheer infectious fun—songs packed with sing-along choruses and catchy, heavily reverbed effects." Joe Gore of Guitar Player called the album "an inspired blend of blissful pop melody and whacked-out psychedelia," comparing it favorably with Medicine and My Bloody Valentine. Trouser Press writer Ira Robbins called it "challenging, uneven and rewarding," and that Polara's sound offered "a door opening to many new possibilities" for Ackerson's love of studio experimentation.

Critical acclaim for Polara led to a bidding war by several major labels; Polara eventually signed to Interscope Records for its second album, C'est la Vie, in 1997.

Personnel
 Ed Ackerson: bass, guitar, Moog synthesizer, organ, percussion, piano, programming, sampling, vocals
 Jennifer Jurgens: vocals
 Jason Orris: electronics
 Matt Wilson: drums
 Lisa Klipsic: loop, background vocals, wah wah piano
 Jay Hurley, Matt Olson: background vocals
 John P. Strohm: drums, guitar, loops, sampling, vocals, wah wah piano
 Produced by Ed Ackerson
 Engineered by Ed Ackerson and Jason Orris
 Ronald Clark: cover design

Track listing

References

External links
Video for "Source of Light"

1995 debut albums
Polara (band) albums